The family Dactylioceratidae comprises   Early Jurassic ammonite genera with ribbed and commonly tuberculate shells that resembled later Middle Jurassic stephanoceratids and Upper Jurassic perisphinctids. Shells may be either evolute or involute.

Description

Ammonites with evolute, serpenticone to cadicone shells with ribs, sometimes with tubercules. Members of this family had no keels. while homeomorphic with stephanoceratids and perisphinctids, they had unique shell structure with double shells and flat-topped ribs on the inner shell. Based on suture differences, they are divided into 2 subfamilies. Reynesocoeloceratinae possess two major secondary lobes in dorsal side of external saddle. This saddle is not divided this way in Dactylioceratinae, while lateral lobe is deeply trifid.

Evolution
It has been suggested, that this family is polyphyletic, but this is now considered to be false. Reynesocoeloceratinae evolved in lower Pliensbachian from Metaderoceras and died out in upper Pliensbachian. Reynesoceras oldest member of Dactylioceratinae evolved in upper Pliensbachian from Cetonoceras, or Prodactylioceras. This subfamily died out in middle Toarcian, during Variabilis zone.

Taxonomy 

Dactylioceratidae Hyatt, 1867
Reynesocoeloceratinae Dommergues, 1986
Reynesocoeloceras Géczy, 1976
Bettoniceras Wiedenmayer, 1977
Prodactylioceras Spath, 1923
Cetonoceras Wiedenmayer, 1977
Dactylioceratinae Hyatt, 1867
Reynesoceras Spath, 1936
Dactylioceras Hyatt, 1867
D. (Dactylioceras) Hyatt, 1867
D. (Orthodactylites) Buckman, 1926
D. (Iranodactylites) Repin, 2000
D. (Eodactylites) Schmidt-Effing, 1972
Nodicoeloceras Buckman, 1926
Peronoceras Hyatt, 1867
Zugodactylites Buckman, 1926
Porpoceras Buckman, 1911
Septimaniceras Fauré, 2002
Catacoeloceras Buckman, 1923
Collina Bonarelli, 1893
Tokurites Repin, 2016

References
Notes

Bibliography
 W. Arkell et al., 1957. Mesozoic Ammonoidea, Treatise on Invertebrate Paleontology, Part L.  Geological Society of America and University of Kansas, Press.

 
Ammonitida families
Eoderoceratoidea
Early Jurassic ammonites
Early Jurassic first appearances
Early Jurassic extinctions